Teenage Retirement  is the only studio album by American rock band Chumped, released on November 18, 2014, through Anchorless Records.

Background
The album is titled after the band some members played in prior to Chumped's formation. The album's sound has been compared to that of Superchunk, Nirvana, and Slingshot Dakota. A music video for "December is the Longest Month" was released in December 2014.

Anika Pyle discussed the album's title in an interview prior to its release:

Critical reception

Many critics gave Teenage Retirement favorable reviews, with Tom Breihan of Stereogum naming it "Album of the Week" on November 18. Josh Terry at Consequence of Sound considered the record "a strong opening statement of charming pop punk with airtight hooks and ripping guitar leads." Mischa Pearlman from Alternative Press described the album thus: "Chumped's debut album couldn’t really be called anything else—its 12 songs throb with both the naïve, reckless abandon of youth and the jaded, tired contemplation of old age." Pitchfork's Devon Maloney wrote that the album "finds that melodramatic sweet spot that made emo and pop punk hit so hard in the '90s and '00s." Zachary Houle of PopMatters felt it a "bonafide enjoyable album [...] Teenage Retirement feels constructed well as a whole." Kyle Ryan of Entertainment Weekly dubbed it "one of 2014's best musical surprises."

Track listing

References

External links
 

2014 debut albums